The E.J. McGuire Award of Excellence is awarded annually to the National Hockey League draft prospect who best exemplifies the "commitment to excellence through strength of character, competitiveness and athleticism"  as selected by NHL Central Scouting at the NHL Entry Draft. The award is named for former NHL Director of Central Scouting E. J. McGuire.

Winners
Key

See also
List of National Hockey League awards

References

National Hockey League trophies and awards
Awards established in 2015